The following is a list of notable people and natives of Cherry Hill, New Jersey.

 John Adler (1959–2011), Congressman for New Jersey's 3rd congressional district from 2009 until his death
 Shelley Adler (born 1959), politician
 Kwesi Adofo-Mensah (born 1981), vice president of football operations for the Cleveland Browns of the National Football League
 Muhammad Ali (1942–2016), former heavyweight boxing champion
 Alene S. Ammond (1933–2019), politician known as "The Terror of Trenton", who served in the New Jersey Senate from the 6th Legislative District from 1974 to 1978
 Treena Livingston Arinzeh, biomedical engineer and professor known for her work researching adult stem-cell therapy
 Maurice Ascalon (1913–2003) and David Ascalon, sculptors and co-founders of Ascalon Studios, and the contemporary industrial designer Brad Ascalon
 Brian Baldinger (born 1960), former National Football League player and television sportscaster
 James Barbour (born 1966), singer and Broadway Actor
 Glen Barker (born 1971), former MLB outfielder who played three seasons for the Houston Astros
 Susan Bass Levin, politician who served as mayor of Cherry Hill and as Commissioner of the New Jersey Department of Community Affairs
 Lawrence Bender (born 1957), Academy Award-winning film and television producer whose credits include Reservoir Dogs, Pulp Fiction, Good Will Hunting, An Inconvenient Truth
 Jay Bennett (1912–2009), author and two-time winner of the Edgar Award from the Mystery Writers of America
 James Berardinelli (born 1967), film critic
 Barbara Berman (born 1938), politician who represented the 6th Legislative District in the New Jersey General Assembly from 1978 to 1980
 David Bianculli, TV critic, columnist, radio personality, non-fiction author and university professor
 Mike Bibby (born 1978), former NBA basketball player who played for the Sacramento Kings
Albert Blaustein (1921–1994), civil rights and human rights lawyer and constitutional consultant who helped draft the Fijian and Liberian constitutions
 Mickey Briglia (1929–2006), college baseball coach at Glassboro State College (now Rowan University) who had an overall record of 502–258–9 in his 25 years coaching the Rowan Profs baseball team from 1964 to 1988
 Abraham Browning (1808–1899), Attorney General of New Jersey from 1845 to 1850, whose Cherry Hill Farm helped give the township its name and is credited with coining the slogan "The Garden State" for New Jersey
 Jalen Brunson (born 1996), basketball player
 Rick Brunson (born 1972), former professional basketball player who played nine seasons n the NBA and is an assistant coach for the Minnesota Timberwolves
 Mark Budz (born 1960), science fiction writer
 Jim Bunning (1931–2017), former major league baseball pitcher with the Philadelphia Phillies and former United States Senator from Kentucky
 Matt Bush (born 1986), actor who is best known for the film Adventureland and his AT&T rollover minutes commercials
 Sarah Chang (born 1980), violinist
 Richard Chess (born 1953), poet
 Bobby Clarke (born 1949), former hockey player and former general manager for the Philadelphia Flyers, three-time NHL Hart Memorial Trophy winner, member of the Hockey Hall of Fame
 Stan Clayton (born 1965), former American football guard and tackle who played in the NFL for the Atlanta Falcons and New England Patriots
 Andrew Clements (1949–2019), writer of children's books, known for his debut novel Frindle
 Garry Cobb (born 1957), former linebacker who played in the NFL for the Detroit Lions, Philadelphia Eagles and Dallas Cowboys
 Sherry Coben, creator of the 1980s situation comedy Kate & Allie
 Avon Cobourne (born 1979), former professional running back who played in the NFL for the Detroit Lions and in the CFL for the Montreal Alouettes and Hamilton Tiger-Cats
 Andy Coen (born 1964), head coach of the Lehigh University Mountain Hawks football team since the 2006 season
 Lauren Cohan (born 1982), actress
 Major Coxson (1929–1973), Philadelphia drug kingpin
 Joe Culmone (1931–1996), Thoroughbred horse racing jockey
 Randall Cunningham (born 1963), former NFL quarterback for the Philadelphia Eagles
 Dick Curl (born 1940), first varsity football head coach at Cherry Hill High School East, 1968–1973, who coached for the St. Louis Rams
 Billy DeAngelis (born 1946), professional basketball player who spent one season in the American Basketball Association (ABA) with the New York Nets during the 1970–1971 season
 Michaela DePrince (born 1995), Sierra Leonean-American ballet dancer
 Eric Dezenhall (born 1962), author of fiction and nonfiction books, including Glass Jaw: A Manifesto for Defending Fragile Reputations in an Age of Instant Scandal, Money Wanders and The Devil Himself
 Laurence Dreyfus (born 1952), musicologist and player of the viola da gamba who was University Lecturer and Fellow of Magdalen College, Oxford
 Angela Duckworth (born 1970), 2013 MacArthur Grant Recipient and professor of psychology at the University of Pennsylvania
 Andrea Dworkin (1946–2005), feminist and writer
 Darren Elias (born 1986), professional poker player who has won three World Poker Tour titles
 Judy Faulkner (born 1943), CEO and co-founder of Epic Systems, a healthcare software company
 Stink Fisher (born 1970), actor and restaurant owner
 Siggy Flicker (born 1967), cast member on the seventh season of Bravo's reality television series The Real Housewives of New Jersey
 Rick Folbaum (born 1969), co-anchor for WNYW-TV New York's weekday 6 pm newscasts. Attended Cherry Hill High School West
 Ed Foley (born 1967), football coach and former player
 Ed Foley Sr., former football quarterback who played for the Boston College Eagles from 1963 to 1965, who is father of Ed and Glenn
 Glenn Foley (born 1970), former NFL quarterback who played in the NFL for the New York Jets and the Seattle Seahawks
 Casey Fossum (born 1978), Major League Baseball pitcher who played at Cherry Hill American Little League
 Jona Frank (born 1966), portrait photographer and author of Cherry Hill A Childhood Reimagined
 Earl N. Franklin (1917–2013), one of the original Tuskegee Airmen
 Yale Galanter (born 1956), criminal defense attorney best known for representing O. J. Simpson since 2000
 Anthony Gigliotti (1922–2001), clarinetist and music teacher, who joined the Philadelphia Orchestra as its principal clarinetist in 1949 and continued in this position for 47 years
 Eric Goldberg (born 1955), animator and film director best known for his work at Walt Disney Animation Studios
 Bob Greene, (born 1958), personal trainer who has been a frequent guest on The Oprah Winfrey Show
 Louis Greenwald (born 1967), politician who represents the 6th Legislative District in the New Jersey General Assembly
 Maria Barnaby Greenwald (1940–1995), first female mayor of Cherry Hill, county freeholder and surrogate
 Tommy Gunn (born 1967), pornographic actor
 Harrison Hand (born 1998), American football cornerback for the Minnesota Vikings
 Gene Hart (1931–1999), longtime Philadelphia Flyers announcer
 Lauren Hart (born 1967), recording artist best known for singing "The Star-Spangled Banner" and "O Canada" prior to Philadelphia Flyers games
 Orel Hershiser (born 1958), former professional baseball pitcher, who attended Cherry Hill High School East Class of 1976
 Tom Hessert III (born 1986), racecar driver in NASCAR and the ARCA Menards Series
 Kevin Hickman (born 1971), former football tight end who played in the NFL for the Detroit Lions from 1995 to 1998
 Elie Honig, attorney and CNN senior legal analyst
 Tim Howard (born 1979), Everton FC and USA National team goalkeeper
 Billy Hunter (born 1942), former wide receiver in the NFL for the Washington Redskins and Miami Dolphins, and current executive director of the National Basketball Association players' union
 Janaye Ingram, beauty queen and political organizer
 Adam Jasinski (born 1978), winner of Big Brother 9
 Steven L Kane, television and theater writer, producer and director
 Nick Katsikis (born 1967), former professional basketball player
 Tom Katsikis (born 1967), former professional basketball player 
 Sean Killion (born 1967), former competition swimmer and Pan American Games gold medalist, who represented the United States at the 1992 Summer Olympics
 Howard Krein, plastic surgeon and otolarynologist
 George F. Kugler Jr. (1925–2004), lawyer who served as New Jersey Attorney General from 1970 to 1974
 Pete Kugler (born 1959), defensive lineman who played ten seasons in the National Football League for the San Francisco 49ers
 Pamela Rosen Lampitt (born 1960), politician who has represented the 6th Legislative District in the New Jersey General Assembly since 2006
 Rick Lancellotti (born 1956), former first baseman-outfielder in Major League Baseball who played for the San Diego Padres, San Francisco Giants and Boston Red Sox
 Ali Larter (born 1976), model, actress, and star of Heroes
 Lee B. Laskin (1936–2020), attorney, politician and judge who served in both houses of the New Jersey Legislature before being appointed to serve on the New Jersey Superior Court
 Aaron Lazar (born 1976), actor and singer Attended Cherry Hill High School West
 Jamie Leach (born 1969), former professional right wing who played in the NHL for the Pittsburgh Penguins, Hartford Whalers and Florida Panthers
 Amos Lee (born 1977), singer-songwriter
 Toby Lightman (born 1978), singer-songwriter and Atlantic Records recording artist
 Michael Lisicky (born 1964), non-fiction writer and oboist with the Baltimore Symphony Orchestra
 Paul Lisicky (born 1959), novelist and memoirist
 John W. Marchetti (1908–2003), radar pioneer
 Greg Mark (born 1967), former defensive end and linebacker who played in the NFL for the Philadelphia Eagles and Miami Dolphins
 Aaron McCargo Jr. (born 1971), chef, television personality and television show host who is best known as  winner of the fourth season of Food Network's reality television show, The Next Food Network Star
 Jim McGorman (born ), musician, songwriter/producer and multi-instrumentalist
 Donovan McNabb (born 1976), former quarterback for the Philadelphia Eagles
 Cristin Milioti (born 1985), Broadway and film actress, who received a 2012 Tony Award nomination for Best Actress in a Musical for her work in Once
 Nate Mulberg, assistant coach of the Richmond Spiders baseball team and of the Israel national baseball team
 Deborah Needleman, editor and writer is editor in chief of T: The New York Times Style Magazine
 Fred Neulander (born 1941), former rabbi of the Congregation M'Kor Shalom, who was convicted of the 1994 contract killing of his wife Carol Neulander
 George Norcross (born 1957), local Democratic party political leader and chief executive of Commerce National Insurance
 Christine O'Hearn (born 1969), lawyer serving as a United States district judge of the United States District Court for the District of New Jersey
 Vince Papale (born 1946), former professional football player, Philadelphia Eagles. Papale was the oldest non-kicker rookie in the NFL and the inspiration for the 2006 film, Invincible
 Bernie Parent (born 1945), retired ice hockey goalie
 Erik Peterson (born 1966), politician who serves in the New Jersey General Assembly representing the 23rd Legislative District
 Jack Pierce (born 1962), Olympic bronze medalist in the 100-meter high hurdles at the 1992 Olympic Games
 Joe Pisarcik (born 1952), former professional quarterback who played in the National Football League for the New York Giants and Philadelphia Eagles
 Mikael Renberg (born 1972), played for the Philadelphia Flyers
 Keith Richards (born 1943), guitarist of the Rolling Stones lived in Cherry Hill while undergoing treatment for heroin addiction in Philadelphia
 Ron Rivera (born 1962), current head coach of the Carolina Panthers and former Super Bowl-winning Chicago Bears linebacker who had been an assistant coach for the Philadelphia Eagles and Chicago Bears
 John A. Rocco (1936–2020), politician who served in the New Jersey General Assembly from 1980 to 1998, where he represented the 6th Legislative District, who also served as Mayor of Cherry Hill 
 "Nature Boy" Buddy Rogers (1921–1992), professional wrestler, first World Wide Wrestling Federation World Heavyweight Champion, first man to hold both the World Wide Wrestling Federation and National Wrestling Alliance World Heavyweight Championships
 Tomas Romero (born 2000), goalkeeper for Bethlehem Steel in the United Soccer League
 Leon Rose (born ), agent for LeBron James
 J. D. Roth (born 1968), host of Endurance
 Wendy Ruderman (born 1969), journalist for The New York Times who won the 2010 Pulitzer Prize for Investigative Reporting together with Barbara Laker
 Kal Rudman, broadcast pioneer and publisher of the music industry trade journal Friday Morning Quarterback, who assisted the rise of the careers of artists including Bruce Springsteen
 Bobby Ryan (born 1987), professional ice hockey forward for the Detroit Red Wings
 Scott Safran (1967–1989), video gamer noted for setting the world record score, which stood for 27 years, on the arcade game Asteroids
 Nadja Salerno-Sonnenberg (born 1961), classical violinist and teacher
 Jennifer Sey (born 1969), author, business executive and retired artistic gymnast who was the 1986 U.S. Women's All-Around National Champion
 L. J. Smith (born 1980), former tight end for the Philadelphia Eagles
 Stephen A. Smith (born 1967), sports journalist for The Philadelphia Inquirer and ESPN television personality
 Scott Storch (born 1973), producer and keyboardist who has written for many artists
 Giselle Tavera (born 1993), pop and bachata singer
 Ariel Versace (born 1992), contestant on season 11 of RuPaul's Drag Race
 Tara Vittese (born 1995), field hockey player who was added to the United States women's national field hockey team
 Michelle Vittese (born 1989), field hockey player selected as part of the U.S. team at the 2016 Summer Olympics
 Bruce A. Wallace (1905–1977), politician who served in the New Jersey Senate from 1942 to 1944 and from 1948 to 1955
 Malcolm Wells (1926–2009), architect and environmentalist who championed earth-sheltered building. He designed an earlier Cherry Hill public library (since torn down), notable houses in the Hunt Tract and Wilderness Acres neighborhoods, and a mostly underground office for his own architectural practice, which still "stands" at 6 Dale Ave., near the corner of East Cuthbert Blvd. and North Park Drive
 Alexa Wilkinson (born 1964), singer-songwriter who was born in Cherry Hill but moved to Park City, Utah aged 12

See also

References

Cherry Hill